Gary Kevin Dillon (born February 28, 1959) is a Canadian former professional ice hockey centre who played 13 games in the National Hockey League with the Colorado Rockies. His brother, Wayne Dillon, also played in the NHL. As a youth, he played in the 1972 Quebec International Pee-Wee Hockey Tournament with a minor ice hockey team from Dorset Park, Toronto.

Career statistics

Regular season and playoffs

References

External links

1959 births
Living people
Canadian ice hockey centres
Colorado Rockies (NHL) draft picks
Colorado Rockies (NHL) players
Fort Worth Texans players
Fredericton Express players
Toronto Marlboros players
Ice hockey people from Toronto